The Opisthothelae  are spiders within the order Araneae, consisting of the Mygalomorphae and the Araneomorphae, but excluding the Mesothelae. The Opisthothelae are sometimes presented as an unranked clade and sometimes as a suborder of the Araneae. In the latter case,  the Mygalomorphae and Araneomorphae are treated as infraorders.

The fairly recent creation of this taxon has been justified by the requirement to distinguish these spiders from the Mesothelae, which display many more primitive characteristics. Those that distinguish between  the Mesothelae and Opisthothelae are:

 The tergite plates on the abdomen of Mesothelae but absent in Opisthothelae
 The almost total absence of ganglia in the abdomen of Opisthothelae
 The almost median position of the spinnerets in the Mesothelae compared with the hindmost position of those of the Opistothelae

Among the Opisthothelae, the fangs of the Mygalomorphae point straight down in front of the mouth aperture and only allow the spider to grasp its prey from above and below, whereas in the Araneomorphae, they face one another like pincers, allowing a firmer grip. Lampshade spiders (family Hypochilidae) show some characteristics of Araneomorphae despite being mygalomorphs and have fangs that can move diagonally. Distinguishing araneomorphs and mygalomorphs on first inspection is difficult unless the specimens are large enough to permit immediate examination of the fangs, although their differences in behavior can provide help for identification in the wild.

References

Arthropod suborders
Spiders